Lost Control Mix is a 1999 Towa Tei remix album. Original versions of all the remixes appear on the album Last Century Modern.

Track listing
 "Last Century Modern (SRATM Remix)" - 3:17
 "Butterfly (Cornelius Remix)" - 4:07
 "Chatr ~Japanese rumba~ (Señor Coconut Remix)" - 4:23
 "Funkin' For Jamaica ~Fallin'for Rio-maxx~ (Shinichi Osawa Remix)" - 7:27
 "New Swing Jack" - 3:00
 "Higher (Y.Sunahara's Studio Remix)" - 7:12
 "Let Me Know (Mighty Bop Remix)" - 5:52
 "LCM (John McEntire Remix)" - 5:26

Towa Tei albums
1999 remix albums
Warner Music Group remix albums